The men's 800 metres event at the 1985 Summer Universiade was held at the Kobe Universiade Memorial Stadium in Kobe on 2, 3, and 4 September 1985.

Medalists

Results

Heats

Semifinals

Final

References

Athletics at the 1985 Summer Universiade
1985